Kantrida Stadium is a football stadium in the Croatian city of Rijeka. It is named after the Kantrida neighbourhood in which it is located, in the western part of the city. It has served as the home of the HNK Rijeka football club for most years since at least 1918. The stadium has a distinctive appearance as it is situated between steep cliffs, a remnant of an old quarry, just north of the stadium and the shore of the Adriatic on its south side.

Since 1990 the venue was occasionally used for Croatia national football team's international fixtures. The national team has never been defeated at Kantrida. The stadium has a seating capacity of approximately 10,600. The stadium is scheduled for major reconstruction over the next several years. A new state-of-the-art 14,438 capacity all-seater stadium will be built at the same location.

History
The location was used as a stone quarry before the first football ground was created on the site in 1911 by HŠK Victoria, a football club based in Sušak (presently part of Rijeka; but at the time a separate town east of the city), and the first football match played at Kantrida was held in 1913, a friendly between Victoria and Građanski Zagreb.

Victoria continued to use the stadium until the end of World War I and the collapse of Austria-Hungary in 1918. The city of Rijeka and the Kantrida territory were then first declared part of the Italian Regency of Carnaro (1919–1920), then the Free State of Fiume (1920–1924), before being formally annexed by Kingdom of Italy in 1924, which remained unchanged until the end of World War II. During this period between 1919 and 1945 Victoria's home town of Sušak was located on the other side of the border as it was incorporated into the Kingdom of Yugoslavia, so the club stopped using the ground. Around this same time the stadium became also the main home ground of CS Olimpia, the predecessor to today's NK Rijeka, and became known as Campo Sportivo Olimpia and became being used for the local Free State of Fiume championship and consequently in the Italian competitions.

In 1926, the 8,000 capacity stands were built and the stadium changed its name to Stadio Borgomarina between 1926 and 1935, as this was the Italian name for the neighbourhood. The stadium was once again refurbished and reopened at a celebrational match between U.S. Fiumana and A.S. Roma, changing its name to Stadio Comunale del Littorio.

After World War II the city of Rijeka and its surrounding area became part of SFR Yugoslavia. The stadium was damaged during the Anglo-American bombings of the city, but the local club (now rebranded to SCF Quarnero) kept using the stadium until early 1947, when the stadium went into refurbishing and the club moved to Campo Cellini until 1951. The club returned to Stadion Kantrida following the completion of its renovation in 1951 and used it interchangeably with Campo Cellini until the mid-1950s. Quarnero changed their name to NK Rijeka in 1954. Since the mid-1950s, Stadion Kantrida has served as Rijeka's home ground.

The stadium was renovated twice, in 1951 and 1958. It formerly had a capacity of 25,000, but in 1999 this was reduced to approximately 10,600 (due to the gradual evolution of UEFA safety standards) and floodlights were installed in 1975. In August 2012, a new 80m² LED display was installed, the largest in Croatia and one of the ten largest in Europe. In December 2013, Adamić press published a monograph that accounts for the first one-hundred years of Stadion Kantrida's history.

The final Prva HNL match prior to stadium reconstruction was played on 19 July 2015, when the match between Rijeka and Slaven Belupo ended in a 3–3 draw.

On 27 February 2016, Kantrida hosted a match between HNK Orijent 1919, a fourth tier club from Rijeka, and NK Lošinj, a fellow 4. HNL club. The match was played at Kantrida due to a pitch upgrade on Orijent's home ground. On 23 and 25 March 2016, two 2016 UEFA European Under-19 Championship qualification matches were played at Kantrida when Croatia hosted Bulgaria (1–0) and Scotland (3–0). In 2016, Kantrida served as home ground for NK Lokomotiva, a 4. HNL club from Rijeka. Since mid-2017, Kantrida hosts ŽNK Rijeka who compete in the 2017–18 Croatian Women's First Football League. Since August 2018, Kantrida also hosts NK Opatija, who play in the 3. HNL. On 8 September 2018, HNK Rijeka returned to Kantrida, where they hosted NK Maribor in a friendly match organised by Armada Rijeka, played in front of capacity crowd of over 10,000. The

Future

On 11 July 2014, HNK Rijeka President Damir Mišković released detailed structure design for the new Kantrida stadium. The current stadium is scheduled to be demolished in the near future and a new, state of the art, stadium built at the same location. The capacity of the new stadium will be 14,438, with all of the seats covered. The stadium will be UEFA category four. The construction of the stadium will be privately funded and the cost has been estimated at €25 million, excluding the cost of commercial facilities (hotel and shopping centre) that will be built next to the stadium. The architect of the project is Gino Zavanella who was also one of the architects of Juventus Stadium. During the stadium construction, HNK Rijeka play their home games at the newly built Stadion Rujevica.

After years of delays, a Memorandum of understanding regarding the construction of the new stadium was signed between Stadion Kantrida LLC and Shaanxi Construction Engineering Group Corporation on 12 April 2019.

Film location 
A scene in the 2016 film The Legacy Run was filmed at Stadion Kantrida. The movie, which is a prequel to the TV Series "Sport Crime", also includes several scenes filmed in the close proximity of the stadium.

Capacity per sector
Seven areas contribute to the total seating capacity of 10,261:
VIP sector: 262
Sector A (main stand): 793
Sector B (main stand): 1,076
Sector C (main stand): 1,144
Sector D (west): 2,371 (traditionally Armada Rijeka sector)
Sector E1 (east): 2,317 (includes away supporters' sector with 579 seats)
Sector E (north-east): 499
Sector F (north): 1,799

Reviews
Kantrida is regarded by many as one of the most original and beautiful stadiums in the world. The stadium's location between a giant cliff and the sea earned it a place in the list of the world's most unusual football stadiums, compiled in 2011 by the CNN. In April 2014, the stadium was included in "The World's Top 13 Most Beautiful Sports Venues", as compiled by Eurosport. In November 2015, FourFourTwo included the stadium in its list of the world's 12 most beautiful football stadiums.

Other uses
In addition to hosting HNK Rijeka matches until July 2015, the stadium was occasionally used to host other football matches and rock concerts. For example, in July 2006, the stadium hosted the Italian pop star Eros Ramazzotti. Kantrida also hosted the final stages of the annual Kvarnerska Rivijera international youth football tournament, first held in 1953. In addition, since 1990, the Croatia national football team played 11 international fixtures at Kantrida, including ten friendlies and one UEFA Euro 2012 qualifying fixture.

International fixtures

Notable fixtures

References

External links

Stadion Kantrida at RijekaSport.hr 
Stadion Kantrida at Nogometni leksikon 
Stadion Kantrida at HNK Rijeka official website 
New Kantrida Stadium Official Project at StadionKantrida.hr 
Stadion Kantrida at www.stadiumguide.com

Sports venues in Rijeka
Football venues in Croatia
stadium
U.S. Fiumana
Multi-purpose stadiums in Croatia
Athletics (track and field) venues in Croatia
Football venues in Yugoslavia
Athletics (track and field) venues in Yugoslavia
Sports venues completed in 1913
Buildings and structures in Primorje-Gorski Kotar County
1913 establishments in Austria-Hungary